e-Ukraine is a sans-serif typeface developed by Fedoriv design agency for Ukrainian government ministries, agencies and corporations. According to the agency, the typeface should become the basis of Ukraine's visual style online.

One of its variations, e-Ukraine Head absorbed the traditional forms of Ukrainian graphical culture of the beginning of the 20th century that partially inherited esthetics of Ukrainian baroque. This typeface is used for headers and main messages in text.

References

Government typefaces
Typefaces and fonts introduced in 2019
Neo-grotesque sans-serif typefaces